The 2014 IIHF U18 World Championship Division I was a pair of international under-18 ice hockey tournaments organised by the International Ice Hockey Federation. The Division I A and Division I B tournaments represent the second and the third tier of the IIHF World U18 Championship.

Division I A
The Division I A tournament was played in Nice, France, from 13 to 19 April 2014.

Participants

Final standings

Results
All times are local. (Central European Summer Time – UTC+2)

Division I B
The Division I B tournament was played in Székesfehérvár, Hungary, from 13 to 19 April 2014.

Participants

Final standings

Results
All times are local. (Central European Summer Time – UTC+2)

References

2014 IIHF World U18 Championships
IIHF World U18 Championship Division I
International ice hockey competitions hosted by France
International ice hockey competitions hosted by Hungary
World
2014 in French sport
2014 in Hungarian sport
Sport in Nice
21st century in Nice
Sport in Székesfehérvár